José Maria da Cruz Martins (born 4 December 1973), better known as Pelé, is a football coach and former player who coaches Casa de Portugal em Macau.

Career
Born in São Tomé and Príncipe prior to it becoming independent from Portugal, Pelé moved first to the metropole and then to Macau, which was Portuguese as well (now a special administrative region of China). A forward, he played for GD Rubro Negro, GD Lam Pak, Dynasty/Vong Chiu, Vá Luen, FC Porto Macau, Casa de Portugal and for the senior Macau national team. He also played in India for Goa-based clubs Vasco SC and Churchill Brothers SC.

References

1973 births
Living people
Place of birth missing (living people)
Portuguese footballers
Portuguese people of São Tomé and Príncipe descent
Association football forwards
Macau footballers
Macau people of São Tomé and Príncipe descent
G.D. Lam Pak players
Macau international footballers
Portuguese expatriate footballers
Portuguese expatriate sportspeople in India
Expatriate footballers in India
Macau football managers